Johan Edvin Birger Gustav Hägglund (born 6 September 1938, in Viipuri) is a retired Finland-Swedish general. He was the Chief of Defence 1994–2001, and Chairman of the European Union Military Committee 2001–2004.

Career
Hägglund's father was General Woldemar Hägglund, commander of the Karelian Front in the Second World War. He was born in Viipuri, an area ceded to the Soviet Union in the Second World War. Despite his Swedish-speaking family background, Finnish language immersion was total in his youth, and he ultimately had to learn Swedish at school. Hägglund went to Svenska normallyceum i Helsingfors and was then educated not only at the Cadet School in Finland, but also attended the United States Army Command and General Staff College in Leavenworth, Kansas. He is also a fellow of Harvard University.

Hägglund commanded United Nations troops in 1978–1979 as the commander of the Finnish battalion (FINBATT) in UNEF II in Sinai, as the commander of UNDOF in Golan in 1985–1986, and as the commander of UNIFIL in Southern Lebanon in 1986–88.

Hägglund served under Presidents Martti Ahtisaari and briefly under Tarja Halonen. Hägglund's command of the defence forces was characterised by the general modernisation of the force and refocusing from quantity to quality. In the Army, three large "readiness brigades" were formed, and the Air Force upgraded to Hornet F/A-18 fighters. Finland entered NATO's Partnership for Peace programme under Hägglund's command.

A major change was made in the terms of conscription service: reserve officers and NCOs would serve 12 months (lengthened from 11 months), but rank and file would serve 6 months (shortened from 8 months), with some specialists such as military police serving 9 months. Previously the rotation had been thrice per year, in order to maintain a contingent that had been trained at least 4 months. The rotation was changed to twice per year.

Within the military, Hägglund was also a strong proponent of peacekeeping operations, worked to improve their appreciation and opined that officers should necessarily participate. Since Finnish law requires that all participants are volunteers, this brought him into conflict with the officers' union, whose opinion was that peacekeeping experience could not be a requirement for career advancement.

Officer training went through a major improvement due to his actions. The cadet school was promoted to university status as the Finnish National Defence University, and degrees formalised.

He has published three books, one concerning the defence of Finland, one about the defence of Europe and an autobiography. In the 2000s, Hägglund promoted the development of the independent defence of Europe, and took the view that the United States would shift its focus away from Europe, changing the role of NATO.

References
Gustav Hägglund: Leijona ja kyyhky (2006), Otava,

Notes

External links
 

1938 births
Living people
Military personnel from Vyborg
Chiefs of Staff (Finnish Defence Forces)
Finnish generals
United Nations military personnel
Harvard Fellows
Non-U.S. alumni of the Command and General Staff College
Chairmen of the European Union Military Committee
Finnish officials of the European Union
Swedish-speaking Finns
Expatriates in Egypt
Expatriates in Lebanon
Finnish expatriates in Israel
Finnish expatriates in Syria